The UK Video Charts  is a group of charts compiled by the Official Charts Company on behalf of The British Association for Screen Entertainment. The charts are based on weekly DVD, Blu-ray and, formerly, VHS sales in 6,500 retailers across the UK. The main chart combines the sales of all video sales in the UK and trades under the name of the Combined Video Chart. There are also charts for the sales of music videos (Music Video Chart) and children's videos, among others. All of the charts are published on the OCC's website.

Charts

See also
UK Music Charts

References

External links
British Association for Screen Entertainment
Current combined chart 

British record charts
Music videos